2022–23 Galatasaray SK Wheelchair Basketball Season is the 2022–2023 basketball season for Turkish professional basketball club Galatasaray.

Sponsorship and kit manufacturers 

Supplier: Umbro
Name sponsor: Tunç Holding
Main sponsor: Tunç Holding
Back sponsor: —

Sleeve sponsor: —
Short sponsor: —
Socks sponsor: —

Team

Players

Depth chart

Squad changes

In

Out

Staff and management

Competitions

Overview

Turkish Wheelchair Basketball Super League

League table

Results summary

Results by round

Matches 

Note: All times are TRT (UTC+3) as listed by the Turkish Physically Handicapped Sports Federation.

IWBF Champions Cup

Group matches (Group A)

Matches

Quarter-finals	(Group B)

Matches

References

External links 
 Galatasaray S.K. official website 

Galatasaray
Galatasaray Sports Club 2022–23 season
Galatasaray S.K. (wheelchair basketball) seasons